Committee for Support to the Reconstruction of the Party (Marxist–Leninist) (in Portuguese: Comité de Apoio à Reconstrução do Partido (Marxista-Leninista)) was a communist group in Portugal, founded in 1974, before the Carnation Revolution. CARP (ML) intended to unify various small marxist-leninist groups into one party.

CARP (ML) joined hands with Marxist-Leninist Revolutionary Unity (URML) and Revolutionary Communist Committees (Marxist-Leninist) (CCR (ML)) to form a common front, the People's Democratic Union (UDP).

CARP (ML) published Longa Marcha.

Defunct communist parties in Portugal